Slobodan Lakićević (Cyrillic: Слободан Лакићевић, born 12 January 1988 in Bijelo Polje) is a Montenegrin retired football player who last played for Rudar Pljevlja.

Club career
Lakićević played in the German second tier for SV Wehen Wiesbaden and had three different spells in Bosnia and Herzegovina.

International career
He made his debut for Montenegro in a March 2010 friendly match against Macedonia, coming on as a late substitute for Luka Pejović. It remained his sole international appearance.

References

External links
 
 

1988 births
Living people
People from Bijelo Polje
Association football midfielders
Montenegrin footballers
Montenegro under-21 international footballers
Montenegro international footballers
Bayer 04 Leverkusen II players
SV Wehen Wiesbaden players
FK Budućnost Podgorica players
FK Velež Mostar players
NK Čelik Zenica players
FK Dečić players
FK Sloboda Tuzla players
FK Jedinstvo Bijelo Polje players
FK Rudar Pljevlja players
Oberliga (football) players
Regionalliga players
2. Bundesliga players
Montenegrin First League players
Premier League of Bosnia and Herzegovina players
Montenegrin expatriate footballers
Expatriate footballers in Germany
Montenegrin expatriate sportspeople in Germany
Expatriate footballers in Bosnia and Herzegovina
Montenegrin expatriate sportspeople in Bosnia and Herzegovina